The 1988 Swedish Open, also known as the Volvo (Ladies) Open was a combined men's and women's tennis tournament played on outdoor clay courts held in Båstad, Sweden and was part of the Grand Prix circuit of the 1988 Tour, as well as the Category 1 tier of the 1988 WTA Tour. It was the 41st edition of the tournament and was held from 11 July through 17 July 1988. Marcelo Filippini won the singles title.

Finals

Men's singles

 Marcelo Filippini defeated  Francesco Cancellotti 2–6, 6–4, 6–4

Women's singles

 Isabel Cueto defeated  Sandra Cecchini 7–5, 6–1
 It was Cueto's 1st title of the year and the 2nd of her career.

Men's doubles

 Patrick Baur /  Udo Riglewski defeated  Stefan Edberg /  Niclas Kroon 6–7, 6–3, 7–6
 It was Baur's only title of the year and the 1st of his career. It was Riglewski's only title of the year and the 2nd of his career.

Women's doubles

 Sandra Cecchini /  Mercedes Paz defeated  Linda Ferrando /  Silvia La Fratta 6–0, 6–2
 It was Cecchini's 2nd title of the year and the 9th of her career. It was Paz's 1st title of the year and the 9th of her career.

References

External links
 ITF tournament edition details
 Official website 
 ATP tournament profile
 WTA tournament profile

1988 in Swedish tennis
July 1988 sports events in Europe